The Brooke rifle was a type of rifled, muzzle-loading naval and coast defense gun designed by John Mercer Brooke, an officer in the Confederate States Navy. They were produced by plants in Richmond, Virginia, and Selma, Alabama, between 1861 and 1865 during the American Civil War. They served afloat on Confederate ships and ashore in coast defense batteries operated by the Confederate States Army.

Design and production
Brookes can be  identified by the presence of at least one band of wrought iron at the breech and a rough-finished, tapering barrel. The barrels were made of cast iron for ease of manufacture, but one or more wrought iron bands was welded around the chamber to reinforce it against the high chamber pressure exerted when the gun fired. All of Brooke's rifles used the same seven-groove rifling with a right-hand twist. Most of Brooke's guns had a Gomer-style powder chamber, shaped like a truncated cone with a hemispherical tip, but the 6.4-inch rifles had a simple hemispherical powder chamber.

These weapons were manufactured at the Tredegar Iron Works (sometimes referred to as J.R. Anderson & Co, after owner Joseph Reid Anderson) in Richmond, Virginia, and at Selma Naval Ordnance Works in Selma, Alabama.

Markings
Guns manufactured at Selma bear the foundry imprint "S", those from Tredegar "TF". "R.N.O.W" may be found on some guns as they were bored and rifled by the Richmond Naval Ordnance Works in Richmond, Virginia after a fire in May 1863 temporarily crippled Tredegar's boring shop.

Types

6.4-inch Rifle
Brooke reported fourteen single-banded  rifles were completed by 8 January 1863, although Tredegar records list only eleven as some were double-banded before being shipped. Three were cast in 1861 with the remainder in 1862. Two of the earliest were mounted on the broadside of the ironclad CSS Virginia. Two were mounted fore and aft on pivot carriages aboard the ironclad gunboat CSS Neuse. Two others were mounted on the broadside of the ironclad CSS Atlanta and survive today in Willard Park of the Washington Navy Yard.

Double-banded rifles were produced from 28 October 1862 by direction of Stephen Mallory, Confederate Secretary of the Navy. Twenty-four were cast by Tredegar between 1862 and 1864 while Selma cast twenty-seven, but only fifteen were shipped due to casting problems. Five of the damaged gun blocks were rebored as  double-banded smoothbores. Nine survivors exist, including four from USS Tennessee (F.K.A. CSS Tennessee II),and one from CSS Albemarle.

7-inch Rifle

The first seven single-banded  were bored and rifled from  Dahlgren gun blocks between July and December 1861. Two of these were the front and rear pivot guns of the CSS Virginia. Tredegar made another nineteen to the Brooke pattern between 1862 and 1863 of which three survive. Two of these are found at the Washington Navy Yard as trophies from CSS Atlanta.

Selma cast fifty-four double-banded rifles in 1863 and 1864, but only shipped thirty-nine due to casting flaws. Tredegar cast thirty-six between 1863 and 1865. Eight survive, two from USS Tennessee (F.K.A. CSS Tennessee II), one in the Washington Navy Yard and the other in Selma.  Another, number S89, may be found at Fort Morgan State Historic Park. On September 29, 2015, an archeological team from the University of South Carolina recovered a 7-inch double-banded gun from the CSS Pedee.

Three triple-banded rifles were cast by Tredegar in 1862. These were  longer than the other 7-inch rifles and were unique among Brooke guns in that they lacked cast trunnions. Instead a separate trunnion strap was fitted around the breech. One was mounted on the CSS Richmond and another was sent to the harbor defenses of Charleston, South Carolina where it remains as a trophy in Ft. Moultrie.

8-inch Rifle

Tredegar cast four double-banded  rifles in April and May 1864. One was mounted in CSS Virginia II while another was sent to the batteries defending the James River. It was present, but lacked shells during the fighting at Dutch Gap Canal on 13 August and 22 October 1864. Shells were delivered on 27 October and 2 November 1864. No known survivors.

Brooke smoothbores
Brooke designed a series of smoothbores that were produced in small numbers by the Selma and Tredegar foundries. Selma re-bored five flawed 6.4-inch blanks as 8-inch double-banded guns, one of which survives in Selma, Alabama. Brooke's 1863 report to Secretary Mallory shows a plate of an unbanded 8-inch smoothbore, but nothing further is known of it. Similar attempts to bore out flawed 7-inch gun blocks to  smoothbores were unsuccessful. Seven  double-banded guns were cast by Selma and four by Tredegar in 1864. Two survive, one of which is a trophy from CSS Columbia in the Washington Navy Yard. Selma cast twelve 11-inch double-banded smoothbores in 1864, although only eight were shipped. One survives in Columbus, Georgia. In 1863 and 1864 two 11-inch triple-banded guns were cast by Tredegar, but none are known to survive.

Ammunition
Brooke's rifles fired both armor-piercing and explosive shells of his own design. The former were solid cylindrical projectiles with a blunt or flat nose to reduce the chance of a ricochet, and were often referred in contemporary accounts as "bolts". The latter were hollow cylinders with rounded or pointed noses. They were filled with black powder with a fuse set to detonate a variable amount of time after being fired. His smoothbores used spherical solid shot for armored targets and hollow spherical explosive shells against unarmored targets.

Specifications 

Note: Data for 8-inch smoothbore is approximate

See also
Siege artillery in the American Civil War
Contemporary rifled artillery
James rifle
Parrott rifle
Sawyer rifle
Wiard rifle

Notes

References

External links

 Brooke gun (rifled, muzzle-loading naval and coastal-defense gun) Web page at Civil War Artillery web site
 Civil War Artillery Projectiles Main page at Civil War Artillery web site
 Confederate Naval Cannons Pictures of Brooke Cannons
 Pictures of the 6.4" and 7" single-banded Brooke rifles from CSS Atlanta
 Machines Of Yesteryear: Civil War Cannon Lathes,  Machines now in the Old Depot Museum in Selma, AL.

Coastal artillery
Weapons of the Confederate States of America
Cannon
Naval artillery
American Civil War artillery